Algebra Colloquium is a journal founded in 1994. It was initially published by Springer-Verlag Hong Kong Ltd. In 2005, from volume 12 onwards, publishing rights were taken over by World Scientific. The company now publishes the journal quarterly.

The journal is jointly edited by the Chinese Academy of Sciences and Soochow University. The journal mainly covers the field of pure and applied algebra.

According to the Journal Citation Reports, the journal has a 2020 impact factor of 0.429.

Abstracting and indexing
 Science Citation Index Expanded
 Research Alert
 CompuMath Citation Index
 MathSciNet
 Mathematical Reviews
 Zentralblatt MATH
 AJ VINITI (Russian)
 Chinese Science Citation Index
 Chinese Math Abstract

References

External links
 AC Journal Website

World Scientific academic journals
Mathematics journals
Publications established in 1994
English-language journals